Suppliant Women may refer to:
 The Suppliants (Aeschylus) by Aeschylus, an ancient Greek play in which the Danaides seek protection from King Pelasgus
 The Suppliants (Euripides) by Euripides, an ancient Greek play in which the mothers of the Seven Against Thebes seek help from Theseus to bury their sons